Evan Jones (June 19, 1846 – January 26, 1899) was the President of the Texas Farmers' Alliance. He advocated cooperative farming and populist political activism.

The newly created Texas Union Labor Party nominated Jones as the candidate for governor in August 1888, but he declined, opting instead to commit entirely to Farmers Alliance activities. He unsuccessfully ran for Congress as a Populist Party candidate in 1892.

References

External links
Evan Jones at the Handbook of Texas Online

1846 births
1899 deaths
Farmers from Texas
People from Erath County, Texas
People from Woodford County, Kentucky
Businesspeople from Texas
Texas Populists
Activists from Texas